Sydney Seaplanes is a domestic and charter carrier in and around Sydney and is the largest seaplane operator in Australia, operating hundreds of flights a week during the peak tourist season. Founded in August 2006 with one aircraft, Sydney Seaplanes has grown in direct response to the growing incoming Asian tourist markets and the leisure VIP market.

History
The airline was formed in August 2006 through the merger of Sydney Harbour Seaplanes, Seaplane Safaris, Southern Cross Seaplanes and two other operators. The founder and managing director is Aaron Shaw. In late 2016, a new era of growth for the airline was ushered in with the new harbourside terminal being opened, with the 'Empire Lounge' restaurant/bar inside. In 2017, Sydney Seaplanes partnered with Dr Jerry Schwartz of Schwartz Family Co. to expand the airlines fleet, placing two additional amphibious Cessna Caravan aircraft online.

In 2016, the new Rose Bay terminal was opened, 'Empire Lounge' as it is affectionately known as is Australia's first purpose built seaplane terminal. With uninterrupted water views and an outdoor decking area it is the ushering in of a new era of growth for the airline.

It has flown celebrities around when in Sydney, including Ed Sheeran, Top Gear and The Grand Tour presenters Jeremy Clarkson and James May, Cuba Gooding Jr, Sam Smith and Pippa Middleton

Fleet

The five aircraft fleet of Sydney Seaplanes includes the following aircraft (at August 2019):

 1 de Havilland Canada DHC-2 Beaver* - VH-AAM
 3 Cessna 208 Caravan - VH-IOV, VH-SXF, VH-ZWH

*Refer below to the incident regarding one of the Sydney Seaplanes owned DHC-2 Beaver.

Sydney Seaplanes also has previously indicated plans to grow the fleet with more Cessna 208 Caravan aircraft.

Destinations 
Sydney Seaplanes currently operate to a number of destinations on a semi regular basis, they also offer charter services. All flights are from the Rose Bay Water Airport in Sydney's Eastern Suburbs.

 Palm Beach (Lilypad, Floating Accommodation)
 Whale Beach (Jonah's Restaurant)
 Cottage Point (Cottage Point Inn)
 Berowra Waters Inn
 Hawkesbury River (Peats Bite)
 Pittwater (Bert's Bar)
 Sydney Harbour Scenic, over Eastern Suburbs, Northern Beaches, CBD and return to Rose Bay

Accidents 

A major incident occurred on 31 December 2017, involving VH-NOO. The aircraft crashed into Jerusalem Bay off the Hawkesbury River after deviating from its usual flight path. All six people on board were killed in the crash (five passengers including an 11yr old girl and one crew, the pilot). The pilot was returning from Cottage Point Inn to the hub of Rose Bay.
The ATSB eventually determined the pilot was incapacitated from Carbon Monoxide poisoning, caused by exhaust gasses entering the cabin through holes in the firewall. The company that maintained the aircraft Airag Aviation Services were found to have left out bolts that secure the magneto access panels to the firewall, creating the pathway.

References

External links
 Sydney Seaplanes

Airlines of Australia
Airlines established in 2006
Australian companies established in 2006
Seaplane operators
Rose Bay, New South Wales
Regional Aviation Association of Australia